Nebojša Golić (born 23 January 1977) is a Bosnian-Serbian former handball player. He is the cousin of fellow handball player Andrej Golic.

Club career
After starting out at his hometown club Borac Banja Luka, Golić moved to FR Yugoslavia to play for Metaloplastika and later Sintelon (1999–2001), before eventually transferring to Germany. He would go on to spend six seasons with HSG Wetzlar (2001–2007). In 2007, Golić returned to Borac Banja Luka after 10 years abroad. He also played for Bosna Sarajevo for one and a half seasons, before becoming inactive.

International career
Golić represented FR Yugoslavia in international tournaments, winning two bronze medals at the World Championships (1999 and 2001). He also participated in the 2000 Summer Olympics and 2002 European Championship. Previously, Golić won the gold medal at the 1998 World University Championship.

Honours
Sintelon
 Handball Cup of FR Yugoslavia: 1999–2000
Bosna Sarajevo
 Handball Championship of Bosnia and Herzegovina: 2008–09
 Handball Cup of Bosnia and Herzegovina: 2008–09

References

External links
 Olympic record
 
 

1977 births
Living people
Sportspeople from Banja Luka
Serbs of Bosnia and Herzegovina
Bosnia and Herzegovina male handball players
Serbian male handball players
Olympic handball players of Yugoslavia
Handball players at the 2000 Summer Olympics
RK Borac Banja Luka players
RK Metaloplastika players
RK Sintelon players
HSG Wetzlar players
Handball-Bundesliga players
Expatriate handball players
Bosnia and Herzegovina expatriate sportspeople in Germany
Serbian expatriate sportspeople in Germany